The British-American Project (BAP) is a transatlantic fellowship of more than 1,200 leaders and opinion formers from a broad spectrum of occupations, backgrounds and political views. BAP operates on a not-for-profit basis, funded through its membership and support from corporate partners. It was originally named the British-American Project for the Successor Generation.

Goals
Established in 1985, BAP was created to help maintain and enrich the long-standing relationship between the United Kingdom and the United States. The Project was the brainchild of Nick Butler, an economist at BP, who at that time was also a prospective Labour Party parliamentary candidate. Along with others in both countries who viewed the special relationship favorably, he had become concerned about a growing tide of anti-American sentiment among his generation in the UK. Butler's response was to propose a series of conferences, developing relationships between the participants and broadening understanding.

A US BAP organiser describes the BAP network as committed to "grooming leaders" while promoting "the leading global role that [the US and Britain] continue to play".

Previous conferences

Organisation
The British-American Project is affiliated with the Johns Hopkins University's Paul H. Nitze School of Advanced International Studies (SAIS). BAP is a non-profit, funded by its members and donations from corporate partners. While acknowledging the connections made among journalists and the political class in the two countries, a 1999 article in The Observer noted critics saying it was another example of too much US influence in Britain.

Notable members

Fellows

Politicians
 Stephen Dorrell
 Alan Sked, founder of the United Kingdom Independence Party (UKIP)
 David Miliband
 The Baron Mandelson
 The Baron Robertson of Port Ellen
 The Baroness Symons
 Jonathan Powell (Tony Blair's chief of staff)
 The Baroness Scotland
 Douglas Alexander
 Geoff Mulgan
 Matthew Taylor
 David Willetts
 Rushanara Ali (2004)
 Diana Negroponte, the wife of John Negroponte

Journalists
 Jeremy Paxman, BBC
 Evan Davis, BBC
 James Naughtie, BBC
 Jane Hill, BBC
 Trevor Phillips, BBC
 Isabel Hilton, The Independent, The Guardian, BBC
 Yasmin Alibhai-Brown, The Independent, The London Evening Standard
 Charles Moore, The Daily Telegraph, The Sunday Telegraph, The Spectator
 Rowan Pelling, The Daily Telegraph
 Hugh Raven, The Sunday Telegraph
 Christopher Cragg, The Financial Times
 Caroline St John-Brooks, The Times Educational Supplement, The Sunday Times
 George Brock, The Times
 Michael Elliott, The Economist
 Daniel Franklin, The Economist
 Diane Coyle, The Independent
 Frederick Kempe, The Wall Street Journal
 Daniel Drezner, The Wall Street Journal, The New Republic, Foreign Affairs, Foreign Policy, The New York Times, Slate, Tech Central Station, among others
 Joel Stein, LA Times

Arts and media
 Margaret Hill, BBC current affairs producer

Other
 Shami Chakrabarti, Former director, Liberty
 Caroline, Lady Dalmeny, Royal United Services Institute
 Christian May, Institute of Directors

References

External links
 British-American Project (official website)
  Transatlantic Elite - British American Project for the successor generation  collection of articles from various publications

United Kingdom–United States relations
Political organizations based in the United States
Political organisations based in the United Kingdom